Damijan Stepančič (born 22 May 1969) is a Slovene painter and illustrator, best known for his  children's books illustrations.

Stepančič was born in Ljubljana in 1969. He graduated from the Academy of Fine Arts in Ljubljana in 1996 and his creative work focuses on illustration for children's books and journals.

He was included on the IBBY Honour List for 2010. He won the  Levstik Award twice, in 2003 for Leteči krožnik na našem vrtu (A Flying Saucer in Our Garden), and in 2011 for Zgodba o sidru (The Story of the Anchor).

Illustrated works

 O zmaju, ki je želel biti kralj (About The Dragon Who Wanted to Be King), written by Slavko Pregl, 2012
 Kako so videli svet (How They Saw The World), co-author with Lucija Stepančič, 2011
 Ali te lahko objamem močno? (Can I Hug You Hard?), written by Neli Kodrič Filipić, 2011
 Čudežni prstan (The Magic Ring), written by Peter Svetina, 2011
 Pravljica o črnem šejku z rdečo rožo (The Tale of the Black Sheikh with the Red Flower), written by Vitomil Zupan, 2011 
 Ko bom velik/a, bom ... (When I Grow Up I Will Be a ...), author and illustrator, 2010
 Zgodba o sidru (The Story of the Anchor), author and illustrator, 2010 
 Dama z železnim ugrizom in druge zgodbe (The Dame With an Iron Bite and Other Stories), written by Evald Flisar, 2010
 Martinček in dinozavri (Little Martin and the Dinosaurs), written by Lucija Stepančič, 2010 
 Škripajoča nočna omarica (The Squeaking Night Table), written by Tatjana Kokalj, 2009
 Majhnice in majnice (Budding Songs, Maying Songs), written by Tone Pavček, 2009
 Ana in Bučko: abecerimarija (Ana and Bučko: Rhyming Alphabet), written by Tone Pavček, 2009
 Naročje kamenčkov, (An Armful of Pebbles), written by Saša Vegri, 2009
 Antonov cirkus, (Anton's Circus), written by Peter Svetina, 2008
 Pesmi iz pralnega stroja, (Poems from the Washing Machine), written by Peter Svetina, 2006
 Mihec gre prvič okrog sveta (Mikey Goes Around the World for the First Time), written by Andrej Rozman - Roza, 2006
 Ukleti Kamurkam (The Enchanted Kamurkam), written by Ruža Lucija, 2005
 Ujeti ribič (The Captured Fisherman), written by Slavko Pregl, 2005
 Leteči krožnik na našem vrtu (A Flying Saucer in Our Garden), written by Janja Vidmar, 2002

References

Artists from Ljubljana
Slovenian illustrators
Slovenian children's writers
Living people
1969 births
Levstik Award laureates
University of Ljubljana alumni